Pakistan German Business Forum (PGBF) was formed on 3 December 1997 with the active support and co-operation of German Ambassador to Pakistan who is its Patron-in-Chief as well as the German Consul-General in Karachi, Dr. Axel Weishaupt actively supported PGBF in 1997.

About PGBF

Pak-German Business Forum is responsible to promote, facilitate and support Industrial and Trade business relationship between the business communities of Pakistan and Germany. PGFB was formed on 3 December 1997.

The Ambassador of Germany in Pakistan is the Patron-in-chief of this organization. It has 160 members, comprising, heads of German multinational companies operating in Pakistan, members from organizations who have Industrial and trade relationship with Germany etc., PGBF operates in close contact with Federation of Pakistan Chamber of Commerce & Industry (FPCCI) and other chambers and enjoys their support and recognition.

On September 1, PGBF, signed an MOU, of business co-operation, with "Chamber of Commerce & Industry, Rahein-Neckar, Mannheim, Germany (IHK)". IHK has more than 5000 members from the German Industrial & trade segments. The objective is to bring together the business communities of Pakistan & Germany into direct contact through a systematic, sustainable and long term approach. Based on the success of this MOU, PGBF has the intention to sign more MOUs with different chambers in Germany to bring together the business communities of Germany and Pakistan.

The activities of PGBF are mostly concentrated in Karachi. It is felt that its activities should be extended to whole of Pakistan specially in the North of Pakistan where large industrial & trade organisations, conducting business with Germany, have a strong presence.

Executive committee

See also
Pakistan Japan Business Forum
Federation of Pakistan Chamber of Commerce & Industry
Board of Investment

References

External links
 Pakistan German Business Forum
 Business Pakistan B2B Portal
 Board of Investment, Govt. of Pakistan

Germany–Pakistan relations
Business organisations based in Pakistan
Foreign trade of Pakistan